Play piercing, needle play, or recreational acupuncture is body piercing done for the purpose of enjoying the experience rather than producing a permanent body decoration. Needles, sharpened bones, or other tools used in play piercing are removed from the body when the episode is complete, allowing the wounds to heal. Those who engage in play piercing may do so for self-expression, imitating tribal rituals , spiritual self-discovery, sexual pleasure, or entertainment.

Play piercing as part of a BDSM scene can produce an endorphin high, which can last for hours and can induce orgasm in many of the people who experience it. The experience of multiple piercings in an erotically or spiritually charged context is qualitatively very different from the experience most people have had with phlebotomists in medical settings, in part because the needle is placed 'through' the skin at a secant so that both ends are accessible, rather than 'into' the skin.

Play piercing should always be carried out using new sterile hypodermic needles or acupuncture needles on skin which has been cleaned with an antiseptic such as alcohol or povidone iodine (which is a potential allergen), by people who have been properly trained. Improper technique can result in the transmission of bloodborne diseases (due to needlestick injuries, for example) or puncture wounds, but if done correctly there is far less danger of injury or infection than from being scratched by a cat due to the depth of insertion being controlled and the use of a sterilized needle.

Needles may be arranged in aesthetically pleasing configurations such as a smiley face, may be laced together like a corset, or may be used to sew on temporary decorations such as bells using sterile thread. Twisting of the needle(s) or pulling them away from the skin will also result a different type of sensation.

A more extreme form of play piercing is flesh hook suspension where a person is suspended vertically or horizontally by one or more hooks through their flesh. This practice is done in some cultures as a rite of passage or as part of a BDSM performance. There are also dance rituals in which flesh hooks attached to multiple people are attached together.

References

See also

Acupuncture
Genital piercing
Modern primitive
Body modification
Hook suspension
RACK: Risk Aware Consensual Kink
Suspension (body modification)

BDSM terminology
Body piercing